A showrunner (or colloquially a helmer) is the top-level executive producer of a television series production who has creative and management authority through combining the responsibilities of employer and, in comedy or dramas, typically also the head writer, script and story editor. They consult with network and studio bosses and maintain the artistic vision of the show, with the writers and editors, and select set design, staff, cast members, and each actor's wardrobe and hairstyle. In many instances, the showrunner also created the show, and subsequent seasons could feature different showrunners. 

While the director has creative control over a film's production, and the executive producer's role is limited to investing, in television shows, the showrunner outranks the episodic directors.

History
In a January 1990 submission to the United States Congress House Committee on the Judiciary Subcommittee on Courts, Intellectual Property, and the Administration of Justice, Barney Rosenzweig (then Executive Vice President and Chairman, Television Division of Weintraub Entertainment Group) wrote:"In the early days of Hollywood, no one questioned what Producer David O. Selznick was to Gone With the Wind, or Pandro Berman to all those Fred Astaire and Ginger Rodgers  films, or Walt Disney to his early work, or Arthur Freed to the MGM musical. They were the producers... the storytellers. Today in television, the producer is still that person: the show-runner. Television is a producer's medium. Ask the people who make and stand behind their shows – from Aaron Spelling to Stephen Cannell, Stephen Bocho , Len Hill, Edgar Scherick or Phil de Guerre [Philip DeGuere Jr.]. The definition of who does what in television today is not that different from what it was generally in Hollywood before a few critics in France coined the term 'auteur' and the Writer's Guild took the producers, their traditional nemesis, to court – thus all but destroying the Producer's Guild and giving leave for the studios themselves to usurp the name producer."

Traditionally, the executive producer of a television program was the chief executive, responsible for the show's creative direction and production. Over time, the title of executive producer was applied to a wider range of roles—from a senior writer, to someone who arranges financing, to an "angel" who holds the title as an honorific with no management duties in return for providing backing capital. The term showrunner was created to identify the executive producer who holds ultimate management and creative authority for the program. The blog and book Crafty Screenwriting defines a showrunner as "the person responsible for all creative aspects of the show and responsible only to the network (and production company, if it's not [their] production company). The boss. Usually a writer."

Los Angeles Times columnist Scott Collins describes showrunners as:

Shane Brennan, the showrunner for NCIS and NCIS: Los Angeles, stated in an interview that:

Canada
The Writers Guild of Canada, the union representing screenwriters in Canada, established the Showrunner Award in 2007, at the annual Canadian Screenwriting Awards. The first Showrunner Award was presented in April 2007 to Brad Wright, executive producer of Stargate Atlantis and Stargate SG-1.

United Kingdom
In the first decade of the 21st century, the concept of a showrunner, specifically interpreted as a writer or presenter with overall responsibility for a television production, began to spread to the British television industry. "Nonetheless, the show runner production model is still less common in drama production in the UK" than it is in the U.S., scholars Ruth McElroy and Caitriona Noonan wrote in 2019.

The first British comedy series to use the term was My Family (2000–11), which had several showrunners in succession. Initially, the show was overseen by creator Fred Barron from series 1–4. Ian Brown and James Hendrie took over for series 5, followed by American writer Tom Leopold for series 6. Former Cheers showrunner Tom Anderson was in charge from series 7 to the final series, series 11.

The first writer appointed the role of showrunner on a British primetime drama was Tony McHale, writer and creator of Holby City, in 2005. Jed Mercurio had carried out a similar role on the less conspicuous medical drama Bodies (2004–2006). But Russell T Davies' work on the 2005 revival of Doctor Who brought the term to prominence in British television (to the extent that in 2009 a writer for The Guardian wrote that "Over here, the concept of 'showrunner' has only made it as far as Doctor Who").

In an interview, Davies said that he felt the role of the showrunner was to establish and maintain a consistent tone in a drama. Doctor Who remains the most prominent example of a British television programme with a showrunner, with Steven Moffat having taken over the post from Davies from 2010 until 2017. Chris Chibnall later took over from Moffat. Davies returned, following Chibnall's departure. The term has also been used to refer to other writer-producers, such as Tony Jordan on Moving Wallpaper and Echo Beach, Ann McManus on Waterloo Road, Adrian Hodges on Primeval and Jed Mercurio on Bodies, Line of Duty, and Critical.

See also
 Television program creator
 Television producer
 Television crew
 Screenwriter
 Television director
 Producer (radio)
 News director

References

Entertainment occupations
Mass media occupations
Television terminology
Broadcasting occupations
 
Management occupations